Stockholm syndrome is a psychological condition.

Stockholm syndrome may refer to:

Music
Bands
Stockholm Syndrome (American band), an American rock-music band
Stockholm Syndrome (Swedish band), a Swedish pop-dance duo

Albums
Stockholm Syndrome (Backyard Babies album), 2003
Stockholm Syndrome (Derek Webb album), 2009

Songs
"Stockholm Syndrome", by  Yo La Tengo from the 1997 album I Can Hear the Heart Beating as One
"Stockholm Syndrome" (Muse song), by Muse from the 2003 album Absolution
"Stockholm Syndrome" (Blink-182 song), by  Blink-182 from the 2003 album Blink-182
"Stockholm Syndrome", by Milburn from the 2006 album Well, Well, Well
"Stockholm Syndrome", by  That Handsome Devil from the 2009 EP Enlightenment's For Suckers
"Stockholm Syndrome" by Greydon Square from the 2010 album  The Kardashev Scale
"The Stockholm Syndrome", a 2013 single by CLMD vs. Kish released on their own label, Up North Recordings, with Sony Music
"Stockholm Syndrome", by One Direction from their 2014 album Four

Other
 Stockholm Syndrome (film), a 2020 Czech television thriller film
 Stockholm Syndrome, a 2016 short documentary by Ami Horowitz
 The Change Constant/The Stockholm Syndrome, the series finale of the American sitcom The Big Bang Theory

See also 

 Stockholm (disambiguation)